Geoscientific Model Development is a peer-reviewed open access scientific journal published by Copernicus Publications on behalf of the European Geosciences Union. It covers the description, development, and evaluation of numerical models of the Earth system and its components.

The journal has a two-stage publication process. In the first stage, papers that pass a rapid access peer-review are immediately published on the Geoscientific Model Development Discussions website. They are then subject to interactive public discussion, during which the referees' comments (anonymous or attributed), additional short comments by other members of the scientific community (attributed), and the authors' replies are published. In the second stage, the peer-review process is completed and, if accepted, the final revised papers are published in Geoscientific Model Development.

Abstracting and indexing 
The journal is abstracted and indexed in the Science Citation Index Expanded, Scopus, Astrophysics Data System, and Current Contents/Physical, Chemical & Earth Sciences.

References

External links 
 

Earth and atmospheric sciences journals
European Geosciences Union academic journals
Bimonthly journals
Publications established in 2008
English-language journals
Copernicus Publications academic journals